Exton Hall is an English country house on the western edge of the village of Exton, Rutland, England, standing in its own extensive park.

The Hall
It was the family seat of the family of Sir James Harington and later the Noel family, Earls of Gainsborough for almost four hundred years. An earlier mansion burnt down in 1810 and is now a ruin which has grand gables and beautiful chimneys like many Elizabethan houses. The ruins are on Historic England's Heritage at Risk Register, at priority category: C - "slow decay; no solution agreed".

The present Exton Hall was built in the 19th century close to the ruins of the original house. In 1869 a Roman Catholic chapel,  dedicated to St Thomas of Canterbury was added, to a design by Charles Alban Buckler.  The hall was used by elements of the U.S. Army Air Force during World War II.  The hall is still in regular use as the private home of Henry Noel, Viscount Campden, and his family. The hall is not normally open to the public, though it is available for a limited number of exclusive private weddings.

The hall is one of the many stately homes in Britain associated with the Legend of the Mistletoe Bough.

Parkland

In the park is Fort Henry, a pleasure-house built in 1788 in the elegant Gothick style which overlooks lakes formed by the North Brook.

There is an extensive description of the parkland surrounding the hall in its own English Heritage listing. The park is extensive, and spreads across the parishes of Exton, Cottesmore, Greetham and Horn.

In 1948 Anthony Noel, 5th Earl of Gainsborough granted the United Steel Companies a lease to quarry ironstone in the Park. Sundew, the world's largest walking dragline, worked the land from 1957 until 1974 when mining ceased. Sundew then slowly walked to Corby. Material was moved by a standard-gauge railway with a loop of nine miles and a link to the exchange sidings at what is now Rutland Railway Museum's site to the West of Cottesmore Village.  The railway was mostly operated by Yorkshire Engine Company steam and diesel locomotives, Yorkshire Engine Company being a United Steel Companies subsidiary.

References

 Account of the Noel family

External links

Country houses in Rutland
Grade II listed buildings in Rutland
Grade II* listed buildings in Rutland
Noel family
Grade II listed houses
Roman Catholic chapels in England